Joachim Bottieau (born 20 March 1989) is a Belgian judoka. He competed in the 81 kg category at the 2012 Summer Olympics; after defeating Omar Simmonds Pea in the first bout, he was eliminated by Ivan Nifontov in the second bout. At the 2016 Olympics he lost to Matteo Marconcini in the first bout.

Bottieau took up judo aged 12, together with his brothers Jean-Yves and Jeremiah. He is coached by his father, who founded the Grand Hornu Judo Club in 1989. He won bronze medal at the 2012 and 2013 European Championships.

References

External links

 
 

1989 births
Living people
Belgian male judoka
Olympic judoka of Belgium
Judoka at the 2012 Summer Olympics
Judoka at the 2016 Summer Olympics
Sportspeople from Hainaut (province)
People from Boussu
Universiade bronze medalists for Belgium
Universiade medalists in judo
European Games competitors for Belgium
Judoka at the 2015 European Games
Judoka at the 2019 European Games
Medalists at the 2009 Summer Universiade
21st-century Belgian people